This is the results breakdown of the local elections held in La Rioja on 3 April 1979. The following tables show detailed results in the autonomous community's most populous municipalities, sorted alphabetically.

City control
The following table lists party control in the most populous municipalities, including provincial capitals (shown in bold).

Municipalities

Logroño
Population: 103,097

References

Rioja
1979